Maria Yuryevna Novolodskaya (born 28 July 1999) is a Russian track and road racing cyclist, who rides for UCI Women's Continental Team  from 2023. She rode in the women's time trial event at the 2018 UCI Road World Championships and took the silver medal in the under-23 time trial at the 2019 European Road Championships.

Major results
Sources:

2016
1st  Individual Pursuit, UCI Junior Track Cycling World Championships
2nd Team Pursuit, European Junior Track Cycling Championships

2017 
UCI Junior Track Cycling World Championships
2nd Madison
2nd Points Race
European Junior Track Cycling Championships
2nd Individual Pursuit
2nd Madison
3rd Omnium
3rd Team Pursuit

2018 
 1st  European U23 Track Cycling Championships, Madison
2nd Overall Tour of Eftalia Hotels and Velo Alanya
National Track Cycling Championships
2nd Individual Pursuit
3rd Team Pursuit
3rd Overall Gracia–Orlová
3rd Time Trial, National Road Championships
3rd Madison, UCI Track Cycling World Cup – Minsk

2019 
1st  Individual Pursuit, National Track Cycling Championships
2nd Time Trial, European U23 Road Championships
2nd Gazipasa
3rd Overall Gracia–Orlová
European U23 Track Cycling Championships
3rd Individual Pursuit
3rd Madison
3rd Madison, European Games
3rd GP Alanya

2020 
 1st  Omnium, European U23 Track Cycling Championships
1st Grand Prix Mount Erciyes 2200 mt
1st Grand Prix World's Best High Altitude
2nd Time Trial, National Road Championships

References

External links
 
Cogeas–Mettler–Look team profile

1999 births
Living people
Russian female cyclists
People from Veliky Novgorod
Cyclists at the 2019 European Games
European Games medalists in cycling
European Games bronze medalists for Russia
Sportspeople from Novgorod Oblast
Olympic cyclists of Russia
Cyclists at the 2020 Summer Olympics
Medalists at the 2020 Summer Olympics
Olympic medalists in cycling
Olympic bronze medalists for the Russian Olympic Committee athletes